Victor Alfonso Scantlebury (March 31, 1945 – December 4, 2020) was an Anglican bishop. He was an alumnus of the Episcopal Theological Seminary of the Caribbean.

A native of Colón, Panama, he was ordained in 1991 as suffragan bishop for the Anglican Church in Central America. In 1994, he was named the acting bishop of the Diocese of Mississippi in The Episcopal Church. He later served as an assistant bishop in the Episcopal Diocese of Chicago. He served as interim bishop for the Episcopal Diocese of Central Ecuador from 2011 until his death.

References

External links
 The Episcopal Church: Victor Alfonso Scantlebury

Panamanian Anglicans
1945 births
2020 deaths
People from Colón, Panama
Episcopal bishops of Central Ecuador
Episcopal bishops of Chicago
Episcopal bishops of Mississippi